The term largest ship includes different categories that are measured in several ways. For advertising, it was common to use "Largest ship in the world" as a marketing ploy for passenger ships.

This term may relate or refer to:

List of longest ships
List of longest naval ships
List of longest wooden ships
List of largest cruise ships
List of largest container ships
List of largest ships by gross tonnage
Largest passenger ships